Empingham Marshy Meadows is a 14 hectare biological Site of Special Scientific Interest north of Empingham in Rutland.

This site in the valley of the North Brook has a complex geological structure and diverse habitats, including grassland and base-rich marsh and fen. Flora in wetter areas include adder's tongue fern, marsh marigold and ragged robin.

Public footpaths from Empingham go through the meadows.

References

Sites of Special Scientific Interest in Rutland